Tinglish (or Thaiglish, Thenglish, Thailish, Thainglish, etc.) refers to any form of English mixed with or heavily influenced by Thai. It is typically produced by native Thai speakers due to language interference from the first language. Differences from standard native English occur in pronunciation, vocabulary, and grammar. The term was coined in 1970, and several alternative terms have been proposed since its inception, such as Thainglish (1973), Thaiglish (1992), Tinglish (1994), Thinglish (1976), Thenglish (2003), and Tenglish (2012).

Characteristics and examples
Characteristics and examples (direct translation) include :
 omission of pronouns
 zero copula
 use of present tense + already, in contrast to past tense of Standard English
 non-standard use or omissions of articles, declension, prepositions, and conjugation.
 addition of Thai final particles, e.g., I don’t know na
 any and every are used interchangeably
 different use of conditional constructions
 no use of double negatives
 moving "S" on singular verbs to the subject, for instance "He's talk too much" instead of "He talks too much"
 omission of prepositions, for instance "I wait you" instead of "I'll wait for you" or "I listen him" for "I listened to him".
 "very" and "very much" are used interchangeably, for instance "I very love my daughter" and "She beautiful very much".

Examples of words and phrases 
Examples (direct translation) include:

Pronunciation

As some sounds in English do not exist in the Thai language, this affects the way native Thai speakers pronounce English words, as displayed in loanwords.

Adaptation of consonants 
English consonants with corresponding sounds in Thai are simply carried over, while others are adapted to a similar-sounding consonant.
 becomes the affricate : "shirt" → .
Initial consonant clusters with  followed by a voiceless unaspirated stop do not occur in Thai, so  is added between these consonants: "start" →  
Final  became  in older loanwords, whereas modern adaptation generally favors  instead: "grill" → . 
Final consonant clusters are generally truncated to only the sound directly after the vowel: "act" → .

Adaptation of vowels 

Tone assignment 
All Thai syllables must have one of five tones (mid, low, falling, high, rising). English words adapted into Thai are systematically given these tones according to certain rules. English loanwords are often unusual in that tone markers are normally omitted, meaning that they are often pronounced with a different tone from that indicated by their spelling.

 Monosyllabic words that end in sonorants take the mid tone, while those that end in obstruents either take the low tone or the high tone, with the high tone predominant.
 For polysyllabics, the nonfinal consonants follow similar rules to monosyllabics, although they always take high tone when ending in obstruents.
 The tone of final consonants that end in sonorants depend on where the stress falls in the original English word. If the final syllable is stressed, the mid tone is taken, while non-final stress correlates with the falling tone being taken.
 Final consonants ending in obstruents take the low, high, or falling tone in descending order of frequency.
According to Wei and Zhou (2002), Thai is a tonal language, whose syllables take approximately the same time to pronounce, Thai people often have difficulty with English word stress. They, instead, stress the last syllable by adding high pitch (Choksuansup, 2014). 
When it comes to vowels, there are 21 phonemes in Thai compared with 15 vowels in English; therefore, it is relatively easy for Thai people to imitate the English vowels. However, the two systems have a significant discrepancy: Thai vowels are distinguished by shortness and length, while for English, it is laxness and tenseness. That explains why Thai English speakers perceive and produce lax sounds as short sounds and tense sounds as long sounds, which gives their pronunciation its uniqueness (Kruatrachue, 1960). 
In terms of consonants, there are a number of English consonants which do not exist in Thai. This makes it difficult for the Thai to perceive the difference among some sounds and produce them correctly. Instead, they replace the English consonants with the most similar sounds in Thai (Trakulkasemsuk, 2012):
 /r/ can be pronounced as /l/ or dropped.
/tʃ/, /ʃ/ and /ʒ/ are altered by Thai /tɕʰ/ (aspirated voiceless fortis palatal stop with slight affrication).
/dʒ/ is substituted by Thai /tɕ/ (weakly glottalized unaspirated voiceless fortis palatal stop).
/θ/  become either / t̪⁼/ (voiceless unaspirated apical alveolar stop), /t/, or /s/.
/ð/ is replaced by /d/
/v/ is pronounced as /w/, and /z/ as /s/
In addition, consonant cluster /st/ does not exist in Thai, so they pronounce it as /sə.t/; for example: stop /sə.tɑːp/. Ending sounds are oftentimes omitted (Choksuansup, 2014).
According to Wei and Zhou (2002), Thai is a tonal language, whose syllables take approximately the same time to pronounce, Thai people often have difficulty with English word stress. They, instead, stress the last syllable by adding high pitch (Choksuansup, 2014). 
When it comes to vowels, there are 21 phonemes in Thai compared with 15 vowels in English; therefore, it is relatively easy for Thai people to imitate the English vowels. However, the two systems have a significant discrepancy: Thai vowels are distinguished by shortness and length, while for English, it is laxness and tenseness. That explains why Thai English speakers perceive and produce lax sounds as short sounds and tense sounds as long sounds, which gives their pronunciation its uniqueness (Kruatrachue, 1960). 
In terms of consonants, there are a number of English consonants which do not exist in Thai. This makes it difficult for the Thai to perceive the difference among some sounds and produce them correctly. Instead, they replace the English consonants with the most similar sounds in Thai (Trakulkasemsuk, 2012):
 /r/ can be pronounced as /l/ or dropped.
/tʃ/, /ʃ/ and /ʒ/ are altered by Thai /tɕʰ/ (aspirated voiceless fortis palatal stop with slight affrication).
/dʒ/ is substituted by Thai /tɕ/ (weakly glottalized unaspirated voiceless fortis palatal stop).
/θ/  become either / t̪⁼/ (voiceless unaspirated apical alveolar stop), /t/, or /s/.
/ð/ is replaced by /d/
/v/ is pronounced as /w/, and /z/ as /s/
In addition, consonant cluster /st/ does not exist in Thai, so they pronounce it as /sə.t/; for example: stop /sə.tɑːp/. Ending sounds are oftentimes omitted (Choksuansup, 2014).

References

External links
Investigating Thai Loan Phonology, Sound Systems of English, LG.236, Lecture 8, Department of Linguistics, Faculty of Arts, Thammasat University, 8 Sep 2008.

Thai language
Macaronic forms of English